Kenneth Lucien Hanna (July 8, 1921 - December 10, 1982) was an American jazz trumpeter, arranger, composer, and bandleader, best known for his work with Stan Kenton. Hired in 1942 by Kenton to add commercial arrangements to the library, he also played trumpet in the band before taking a break for military service. He returned to the trumpet section after the war and continued to contribute compositions and arrangements until 1951. He wrote almost 40 forward thinking compositions and arrangements between 1942 and 1951. He returned to the Kenton writing staff in the late 1960s, contributing over 70 more titles between 1968 and 1977.

Hanna was born in Baltimore. He married Margaret Lee Voorhess (1919–1968), with whom he had a son, Donald Voorhess Hanna (1942–2019),and Stephen Charles Hanna (1947-2020),in 1942.

Discography

As leader
 1955 Jazz for Dancers

As sideman
With Stan Kenton
 Stan Kenton's Milestones (Capitol, 1943–47 [1950])
 Stan Kenton Classics (Capitol, 1944–47 [1952])
 Artistry in Rhythm (Capitol, 1946)
 Encores (Capitol, 1947)
 A Presentation of Progressive Jazz (Capitol, 1947)
 The Kenton Era (Capitol, 1940–54, [1955])
 Uncollected Stan Kenton & His Orchestra, Vol. 5 (1945–1947) (1994)
 City of Glass: Stan Kenton Plays Bob Graettinger  (1995)

With others
 2001 1947–1949, Nat King Cole
 2002 Cool Christy, June Christy
 2002 Those Kenton Days, Art Pepper
 2003 Summit Meetings 1939–50, The Metronome All-Stars
 2003 Young Art, Art Pepper
 2008 Nellie's Nightmare, Buddy Rich

Arrangements & compositions created for Kenton
+ indicates original composition

Early years: 1942-1951

 April In Paris (1947) The Pastels vocal arranged by Dave Lambert
 Atlanta G.A. (1946) June Christy vocal
 Begin the Beguine (1944)
 Black and Blue (1950) Jay Johnson vocal
 Build It Up, Paint It Nice, Tear It Down (1944) Anita O’Day vocal
 Dancing in The Dark (1951) 
 The Day Isn’t Long Enough (1951) Jay Johnson vocal
 Deep Purple (1951)
 Don’t Blame Me (1951) Jay Johnson vocal
 Durango + (1950)
 Gone With The Wind (1950) Jay Johnson vocal
 He’s My Guy (1942) Eve Knight vocal
 How Am I To Know? (1947)
 I Don’t Want to Cry Anymore (1951) Jay Johnson vocal
 I Have Faith, So Have You (1943) vocal
 I Left My Heart at The Stage Door Canteen (1942) Red Dorris vocal
 I Only Have Eyes for You (1951)
 I’d Be Lost Without You (1946) June Christy vocal
 I’m Through with Love (194?) vocal
 In the Still of The Night (1951)
 It Ain’t Necessarily So (1944) Anita O’Day vocal
 The Night We Called It A Day (1946) vocal
 Now We Know (1943) vocal
 One Dozen Roses (1942) Red Dorris vocal
 On the Sunny Side Of The Street (1944) Anita O’Day vocal
 September In the Rain (1947) The Pastels vocal arranged by Dave Lambert
 Somnambulism + (1947)
 Summertime (1945) Gene Howard vocal (long and short versions)
 Sunday, Monday Or Always (1943) Dolly Mitchell vocal
 Then I’ll Be Tired of You (1947) June Christy vocal
 This Is Romance (1946) June Christy vocal
 Tiare + (1948)
 Where or When (1951) Jay Johnson vocal
 You May Not Love Me (1946) Gene Howard vocal
 You’re Not the Kind (1948) June Christy vocal

Later years: 1968-1977

 Angel Eyes (1977)
 Autumn In New York (197?)
 Beeline East + (1972)
 Bogota + (1970) (originally composed 1955)
 Bon Homme Richard + (1970) featuring Dick Shearer
 Bora Bora + (1974) SK band and symphony orchestra
 The Breeze and I (1970) trumpet feature
 The Breeze and I (1975)
 Broadside + (1972)
 Close To You (1971)
 Concerto To End All Concertos (1970)
 Finlandia (1976) Masonic music
 For All We Know (1971)
 Fragments of A Portrait + (1972)
 Frangipani + (1970)
 Hagan’s Alley + (1976) featuring Tim Hagans
 Hindarabi + (1970)
 Invitation (1976)
 It’s Not Easy Bein’ Green (1973) Band vocal
 Last Tango In Paris (1974)
 La Vos Del Viento + (1973) featuring Dick Shearer
 Lazy Tiger + (1973)
 Lonely Windrose + (1970)
 Lonely Windrose + (197?) brass choir & rhythm
 Lonely Windrose + (1974) SK band + symphony orchestra
 Look Who’s Mine (1974)
 The Lord’s Prayer (1976) Masonic music
 Lunada + (1970)
 Lunada + (revised 1972)
 Lunada + (revised 1973)
 Macumba Suite + (in 4 Movements) (1971)
 Mantilla + (1976)
 Medianoche + (re-working of Vax-Elation, co-composed by Hanna & Hank Levy) (1973)
 Montage + (1973)
 Montage + (1973) revised shorter version
 Montiya + (197?)
 Moorea + (1974) SK band + symphony orchestra
 Moorea + (1976)
 My Way (1971)
 Naima + (1974)
 No Media Noche + (197?)
 Querida * (1973) featuring Stan Kenton
 Reflections _ (1972)
 Reynolds-Rap + (1973) featuring Roy Reynolds
 Send in The Clowns (1974)
 Sensitivo + (1975)
 September Morn + (1976)
 Serapo + (197?)
 Similau + (1970)
 Sirocco + (1971) featuring Mike Jamieson
 Six Adagios (1976) Masonic music 
 Snowfall (1977)
 The Song Is You (1974)
 Stars and Stripes Forever (1976) Masonic music
 Strangers (1971)
 The Summer Knows (1972)
 Summer Me, Winter Me (1970)
 Theme for Autumn + (1972)
 This Is All I Ask (1977) featuring Dick Shearer
 Tiare + (1968) Neophonic
 Tiare + (1970)
 Tiare + (1974) SK band and symphony orchestra
 A Time for Love (1974)
 Turido + (197?)
 Vax + (Vax-Elation) (1972) co-composed by Hanna & Hank Levy, featuring Mike Vax
 Wave (1975)
 Westwind + (1976)
 What Are You Doing the Rest Of Your Life? (1970)
 What’s New (1977)
 You Are the Sunshine of My Life (1974)
 You Go to My Head (1976)
 You Must Believe In Spring (1977)

References

American jazz trumpeters
American male trumpeters
American jazz bandleaders
American jazz composers
American male jazz composers
1982 deaths
1921 births
20th-century American composers
20th-century trumpeters
20th-century American male musicians
20th-century jazz composers